Fenton is a small village in the City of Carlisle district, in the English county of Cumbria. It is near the small town of Brampton.

Villages in Cumbria
Hayton, Carlisle